Short-limb skeletal dysplasia with severe combined immunodeficiency is an extremely rare autosomal recessive type of achondroplasia which is characterized by short stature,  bowing of the long bones, and generalized metaphyseal abnormalities alongside signs of SCID such as recurrent severe infections, failure to thrive, chronic diarrhea, and a notable absence of T and B lymphocytes. Around 11 cases have been described in medical literature.

References 

Cell surface receptor deficiencies
Connective tissue diseases
Growth disorders
Rare diseases
Immunodeficiency
Genetic diseases and disorders
Autosomal recessive disorders